Lepidochrysops synchrematiza, the untailed blue giant Cupid, is a butterfly in the family Lycaenidae. It is found in Senegal, the Gambia, Guinea, Sierra Leone, Liberia, Ivory Coast, Ghana and Togo. The habitat consists of the forest/savanna transition zone.

References

Butterflies described in 1923
Lepidochrysops